Andrea Goldsmith   is an American electrical engineer and the Dean of Engineering and Applied Science at Princeton University. She is also the Arthur LeGrand Doty Professor of Electrical Engineering at Princeton. She was previously the Stephen Harris Professor in the School of Engineering at Stanford University, as well as a faculty affiliate at the Stanford Neurosciences Institute.  Her interests are in the design, analysis and fundamental performance limits of wireless systems and networks, and in the application of communication theory and signal processing to neuroscience. She also co-founded and served as chief technology officer of Plume WiFi and Quantenna Communications. Since 2021, she has been a member of the President’s Council of Advisors on Science and Technology (PCAST).

Early life and education
Goldsmith was raised in the San Fernando Valley, California. Her father Werner Goldsmith was a professor of mechanical engineering at UC Berkeley, and her mother Adrienne Goldsmith was an animator for cartoon shows including The Rocky and Bullwinkle Show. Goldsmith earned her bachelor's degree in engineering math from the University of California, Berkeley, in 1986, and her MS and PhD in electrical engineering from UC Berkeley in 1991 and 1994, respectively. In the years between obtaining her bachelor's and PhD, she spent four years as a systems engineer at a Silicon Valley defense communications startup.

Work and academic career
Goldsmith started her academic career at the California Institute of Technology and was there for four years. She joined Stanford in 1999, becoming an associate professor in 2002 and a full professor in 2007. At Stanford, she has served as chair of the faculty senate, and on the school's task force on women and leadership. In 2006, she took a leave of absence from Stanford and co-founded Quantenna Communications, a company that produces silicon chipsets designed for high-speed, wireless high-definition video home networking. She served as chief technology officer of the startup until returning to Stanford in 2008. She was also a founder and CTO of Plume WiFi, which was founded in 2014 and develops WiFi technology. She joined Princeton in 2020 as Dean of Engineering and Applied Science at a pivotal time, where it is expected to grow its engineering faculty by 50%, build a new neighborhood with new buildings for all engineering departments and interdisciplinary institutes, and foster significantly more innovation, entrepreneurship, and partnerships with industry.

As an inventor and consultant, she has secured 29 patents. She has authored and co-authored several books, including Wireless Communication, MIMO Wireless Communications and Principles of Cognitive Radio. She has launched and led several multi-university research projects, including DARPA's ITMANET program, and she is a principal investigator in the National Science Foundation Center on the Science of Information.

In the IEEE, Goldsmith served on the board of governors for both the Information Theory and Communications societies. She has also been a distinguished lecturer for both societies, served as president of the IEEE Information Theory Society in 2009, founded and chaired the Student Committee of the IEEE Information Theory society, and chaired the Emerging Technology Committee of the IEEE Communications Society. She chairs the IEEE Committee on Diversity and Inclusion.

She won the 2017 Women in Communications Engineering Mentorship Award from the IEEE Communications Society for her efforts in encouraging women in the fields of technology and engineering. In 2017, she was elected to the Academy of Arts and Sciences, and also to the National Academy of Engineering for contributions to adaptive and multiantenna wireless communications. Goldsmith won the 2020 Marconi Prize, generally recognized as the top prize in communications.

Awards
 National Academy of Engineering Gilbreth Lecture Award, 2002
 Silicon Valley Business Journal Women of Influence Award, 2010  
 IEEE Communications Society Edwin H. Armstrong Achievement Award, 2014
 Member, National Academy of Engineering, 2017–present 
 Member, American Academy of Arts and Sciences, 2017–present
 Women in Communications Engineering (WICE) Mentorship Award, 2017
 ACM Athena Lecturer Award, 2018
 Marconi Prize, 2020

Publications

Books and book chapters
 Entropy, Mutual Information, and Capacity for Markov Channels with General Inputs, T. Holliday, A. Goldsmith, P. Glynn, Stanford University Press, 2002
 EE359 Wireless Communications, A. Goldsmith, Stanford University Press, 2002
 Wireless Communications, A. Goldsmith, Cambridge University Press, 2005
 MIMO Wireless Communications, E. Biglieri, Cambridge University Press, 2007 
 Principles of Cognitive Radio, A. Goldsmith, L. Greenstein, N. Mandayam, H.V. Poor, Cambridge University Press, 2012

Personal life
Goldsmith lives in Menlo Park, California, with her husband, scientist Arturo Salz, and their children.

External links
 People of ACM.
 Google Scholar, Andrea Goldsmith
 Andrea Goldsmith Profile at Stanford University

References

Living people
American electrical engineers
Stanford University faculty
Local area networks
Wireless networking
American women computer scientists
American computer scientists
People from Menlo Park, California
People from the San Fernando Valley
UC Berkeley College of Engineering alumni
California Institute of Technology faculty
Electrical engineering academics
Fellows of the American Academy of Arts and Sciences
American women engineers
Fellows of the Royal Academy of Engineering
Female Fellows of the Royal Academy of Engineering
Stanford University Department of Electrical Engineering faculty
Engineers from California
21st-century women engineers
Year of birth missing (living people)
American telecommunications engineers
American women academics
21st-century American women